The Weekly may refer to:

 The Weekly with Charlie Pickering, an Australian news satire series
 The Weekly with Wendy Mesley, a defunct Canadian news series
 The New York Times Presents, an American documentary series titled The Weekly for its first season